The 1964 British Formula Three season was the 14th season of the British Formula 3 season. Jackie Stewart took the BARC Championship, while Rodney Banting took the BRSCC Championship.

BARC Championship
Champion: Jackie Stewart

Runner Up: John Taylor

Results

BRSCC Championship
Champion: Rodney Banting

Runner Up: Chris Irwin

Results

External links
 The official website of the British Formula 3 Championship

British Formula Three Championship seasons
Formula Three